Bernard Cooper is an American novelist and short story writer. He was born on October 3, 1951, in Hollywood, California.
His writing is in part autobiographical and influenced by his own experiences as a gay man.
Bernard Cooper's fiction and essays have received several awards. He has both his BFA and MFA in art from California Institute of the Arts.

Cooper has taught at the California Institute of the Arts and Bennington College, and in 2014 he served as the prestigious Bedell Distinguished Visiting Professor at the University of Iowa's Nonfiction Writing Program.

Works
(1990) Maps to Anywhere
(1991) A Clack of Tiny Sparks: Remembrances of a Gay Boyhood
(1993) A Year of Rhymes
(1996) Truth Serum
(2000) Guess Again
(2006) The Bill From My Father: A Memoir

References

External links
 Bernard Cooper Information from The Steven Barclay Agency 

1951 births
American gay writers
Jewish American writers 
Lambda Literary Award winners
Hemingway Foundation/PEN Award winners
LGBT Jews
Living people
People from Hollywood, Los Angeles
20th-century American novelists
21st-century American novelists
American LGBT novelists
LGBT people from California
American male novelists
American memoirists
Gay memoirists
20th-century American male writers
21st-century American male writers
20th-century American non-fiction writers
21st-century American non-fiction writers
American male non-fiction writers
21st-century American Jews
21st-century LGBT people